The 1998–99 NBA season was the Kings' 50th season in the National Basketball Association, and 14th season in Sacramento. On March 23, 1998, the owners of all 29 NBA teams voted 27–2 to reopen the league's collective bargaining agreement, seeking changes to the league's salary cap system, and a ceiling on individual player salaries. The National Basketball Players Association (NBPA) opposed to the owners' plan, and wanted raises for players who earned the league's minimum salary. After both sides failed to reach an agreement, the owners called for a lockout, which began on July 1, 1998, putting a hold on all team trades, free agent signings and training camp workouts, and cancelling many NBA regular season and preseason games. Due to the lockout, the NBA All-Star Game, which was scheduled to be played in Philadelphia on February 14, 1999, was also cancelled. However, on January 6, 1999, NBA commissioner David Stern, and NBPA director Billy Hunter finally reached an agreement to end the lockout. The deal was approved by both the players and owners, and was signed on January 20, ending the lockout after 204 days. The regular season began on February 5, and was cut short to just 50 games instead of the regular 82-game schedule.

In the 1998 NBA draft, the Kings selected Jason Williams from the University of Florida with the seventh pick; Williams would earn the nickname "White Chocolate", and would also be known for his flashy passes and crossovers. During the off-season, the team acquired All-Star forward Chris Webber from the Washington Wizards, and signed free agents Vlade Divac, Vernon Maxwell, three-point specialist Jon Barry, and second-year center Scot Pollard, who was signed midway through the season while Terry Dehere was released to free agency. After playing in Europe, Serbian forward Peja Stojaković, who was drafted 14th overall by the Kings in the 1996 NBA draft, would finally make his debut in the NBA. Under new head coach Rick Adelman, the Kings struggled playing below .500 with a 17–22 start, but then improved winning ten of their final eleven games, finishing third in the Pacific Division with a 27–23 record, their first winning season in 16 years.

Webber averaged 20.0 points, 13.0 rebounds and 2.1 blocks per game, and was named to the All-NBA Second Team, while Divac averaged 14.3 points, 10.0 rebounds and 4.3 assists per game, and Williams provided the team with 12.8 points, 6.0 assists and 1.9 steals per game, and was named to the NBA All-Rookie First Team. In addition, Corliss Williamson provided with 13.2 points per game, and second-year guard Tariq Abdul-Wahad contributed 9.3 points per game. Off the bench, Maxwell contributed 10.7 points per game, while second-year forward Lawrence Funderburke averaged 8.9 points and 4.7 rebounds per game, and Stojaković provided with 8.4 points per game. Webber also finished in seventh place in Most Valuable Player voting, while Williams finished in second place in Rookie of the Year voting behind Vince Carter of the Toronto Raptors.

In the Western Conference First Round of the playoffs, the Kings got off to a good start, taking a 2–1 series lead over the 3rd–seeded Utah Jazz. However, the Jazz won Game 4 on the road by one point to even the series, 90–89, and force a decisive fifth game. The Kings would lose Game 5 on the road in overtime, 99–92. Following the season, Abdul-Wahad was traded to the Orlando Magic, and Maxwell signed as a free agent with the Seattle SuperSonics.

For the season, the Kings added new purple alternate road uniforms with black side panels to their shorts, which would remain in use until 2002.

Draft picks

Roster

Roster Notes
 Shooting guard Chris Robinson was placed on the inactive list, and did not play for the Kings this season.

Regular season

Season standings

z – clinched division title
y – clinched division title
x – clinched playoff spot

Record vs. opponents

Game log

|-style="background:#fcc;"
| 1
| February 5
| @ San Antonio
| 
| Jason Williams (21)
| Chris Webber (12)
| Williams, Webber, Abdul-Wahad (3)
| Alamodome19,002
| 0–1
|-style="background:#cfc;"
| 2
| February 7
| Vancouver
| 
| Chris Webber (25)
| Vlade Divac (16)
| Vlade Divac (10)
| ARCO Arena17,317
| 1–1
|-style="background:#cfc;"
| 3
| February 9
| @ Phoenix
| 
| Chris Webber (28)
| Chris Webber (20)
| Vlade Divac (7)
| America West Arena18,217
| 2–1
|-style="background:#fcc;"
| 4
| February 10
| @ Houston
| 
| Chris Webber (21)
| Chris Webber (19)
| Tariq Abdul-Wahad (5)
| Compaq Center16,285
| 2–2
|-style="background:#fcc;"
| 5
| February 15
| @ Utah
| 
| Chris Webber (26)
| Chris Webber (11)
| Jason Williams (7)
| Delta Center19,911
| 2–3
|-style="background:#cfc;"
| 6
| February 16
| Boston
| 
| Webber, Williamson (22)
| Chris Webber (15)
| Vlade Divac (8)
| ARCO Arena16,576
| 3–3
|-style="background:#cfc;"
| 7
| February 17
| @ Seattle
| 
| Chris Webber (23)
| Webber, Divac (14)
| Jason Williams (5)
| KeyArena17,072
| 4–3
|-style="background:#cfc;"
| 8
| February 19
| Charlotte
| 
| Jason Williams (25)
| Chris Webber (14)
| Jon Barry (5)
| ARCO Arena17,317
| 5–3
|-style="background:#fcc;"
| 9
| February 21
| @ Minnesota
| 
| Chris Webber (20)
| Lawrence Funderburke (12)
| Jason Williams (8)
| Target Center16,848
| 5–4
|-style="background:#fcc;"
| 10
| February 22
| @ Orlando
| 
| Chris Webber (22)
| Chris Webber (13)
| Jason Williams (7)
| Orlando Arena16,542
| 5–5
|-style="background:#fcc;"
| 11
| February 24
| @ Philadelphia
| 
| Chris Webber (21)
| Chris Webber (11)
| Jason Williams (7)
| First Union Center14,437
| 5–6
|-style="background:#cfc;"
| 12
| February 25
| @ Washington
| 
| Vlade Divac (22)
| Vlade Divac (17)
| Chris Webber (10)
| MCI Center16,813
| 6–6
|-style="background:#fcc;"
| 13
| February 27
| @ Dallas
| 
| Vlade Divac (20)
| Chris Webber (14)
| Jason Williams (7)
| Reunion Arena15,009
| 6–7

|-style="background:#fcc;"
| 14
| March 1
| Seattle
| 
| Chris Webber (20)
| Chris Webber (14)
| Jason Williams (10)
| ARCO Arena16,786
| 6–8
|-style="background:#cfc;"
| 15
| March 2
| @ Vancouver
| 
| Chris Webber (36)
| Chris Webber (17)
| Jason Williams (9)
| General Motors Place13,252
| 7–8
|-style="background:#fcc;"
| 16
| March 3
| Portland
| 
| Chris Webber (20)
| Chris Webber (14)
| Chris Webber (6)
| ARCO Arena15,160
| 7–9
|-style="background:#cfc;"
| 17
| March 6
| @ Phoenix
| 
| Jason Williams (24)
| Chris Webber (14)
| Webber, Williams (6)
| America West Arena19,023
| 8–9
|-style="background:#cfc;"
| 18
| March 7
| Dallas
| 
| Chris Webber (18)
| Chris Webber (13)
| Chris Webber (7)
| ARCO Arena14,715
| 9–9
|-style="background:#fcc;"
| 19
| March 9
| @ Portland
| 
| Lawrence Funderburke (18)
| Vlade Divac (16)
| Webber, Maxwell (5)
| Rose Garden18,147
| 9–10
|-style="background:#fcc;"
| 20
| March 11
| @ L.A. Clippers
| 
| Vlade Divac (19)
| Chris Webber (9)
| Jason Williams (4)
| Los Angeles Memorial Sports Arena7,884
| 9–11
|-style="background:#fcc;"
| 21
| March 12
| Minnesota
| 
| Jason Williams (17)
| Chris Webber (10)
| Jason Williams (5)
| ARCO Arena17,317
| 9–12
|-style="background:#cfc;"
| 22
| March 14
| L.A. Lakers
| 
| Jason Williams (21)
| Chris Webber (11)
| Williams, Divac (5)
| ARCO Arena17,317
| 10–12
|-style="background:#cfc;"
| 23
| March 15
| @ Golden State
| 
| Chris Webber (20)
| Vlade Divac (8)
| Webber, Divac (6)
| The Arena in Oakland17,317
| 11–12
|-style="background:#fcc;"
| 24
| March 16
| San Antonio
| 
| Vlade Divac (18)
| Chris Webber (14)
| Jason Williams (10)
| ARCO Arena14,570
| 11–13
|-style="background:#fcc;"
| 25
| March 18
| Portland
| 
| Chris Webber (16)
| Chris Webber (20)
| Jason Williams (5)
| ARCO Arena14,397
| 11–14
|-style="background:#fcc;"
| 26
| March 20
| @ Dallas
| 
| Tariq Abdul-Wahad (16)
| Chris Webber (16)
| Vlade Divac (6)
| Reunion Arena16,161
| 11–15
|-style="background:#fcc;"
| 27
| March 22
| @ Houston
| 
| Chris Webber (29)
| Chris Webber (11)
| Chris Webber (6)
| Compaq Center16,285
| 11–16
|-style="background:#cfc;"
| 28
| March 24
| New York
| 
| Vernon Maxwell (19)
| Chris Webber (9)
| Vlade Divac (10)
| ARCO Arena17,023
| 12–16
|-style="background:#cfc;"
| 29
| March 26
| @ L.A. Lakers
| 
| Chris Webber (29)
| Webber, Divac (10)
| Jason Williams (12)
| Great Western Forum17,505
| 13–16
|-style="background:#fcc;"
| 30
| March 28
| Houston
| 
| Jason Williams (21)
| Lawrence Funderburke (15)
| Vlade Divac (5)
| ARCO Arena17,317
| 13–17
|-style="background:#cfc;"
| 31
| March 30
| Utah
| 
| Vernon Maxwell (33)
| Vlade Divac (13)
| Michael Hawkins (7)
| ARCO Arena17,317
| 14–17
|-style="background:#fcc;"
| 32
| March 31
| @ Portland
| 
| Vlade Divac (20)
| Vlade Divac (12)
| Vlade Divac (7)
| Rose Garden18,468
| 14–18

|-style="background:#fcc;"
| 33
| April 3
| @ Minnesota
| 
| Vlade Divac (19)
| Chris Webber (10)
| Vlade Divac (9)
| Target Center17,011
| 14–19
|-style="background:#cfc;"
| 34
| April 6
| @ Seattle
| 
| Jason Williams (21)
| Vlade Divac (14)
| Vlade Divac (10)
| KeyArena17,072
| 15–19
|-style="background:#fcc;"
| 35
| April 7
| L.A. Lakers
| 
| Corliss Williamson (22)
| Chris Webber (16)
| Webber, Stojaković (6)
| ARCO Arena17,317
| 15–20
|-style="background:#cfc;"
| 36
| April 10
| Denver
| 
| Chris Webber (23)
| Vlade Divac (15)
| Jason Williams (9)
| ARCO Arena17,317
| 16–20
|-style="background:#cfc;"
| 37
| April 11
| @ Vancouver
| 
| Chris Webber (24)
| Chris Webber (10)
| Jason Williams (7)
| General Motors Place17,167
| 17–20
|-style="background:#fcc;"
| 38
| April 13
| Utah
| 
| Corliss Williamson (22)
| Chris Webber (16)
| Chris Webber (8)
| ARCO Arena17,317
| 17–21
|-style="background:#fcc;"
| 39
| April 15
| Seattle
| 
| Chris Webber (26)
| Chris Webber (21)
| Jason Williams (13)
| ARCO Arena17,317
| 17–22
|-style="background:#cfc;"
| 40
| April 17
| Denver
| 
| Corliss Williamson (29)
| Vlade Divac (14)
| Jason Williams (11)
| ARCO Arena16,285
| 18–22
|-style="background:#cfc;"
| 41
| April 19
| @ L.A. Clippers
| 
| Corliss Williamson (23)
| Tariq Abdul-Wahad (9)
| Jason Williams (14)
| Arrowhead Pond of Anaheim10,878
| 19–22
|-style="background:#cfc;"
| 42
| April 21
| Golden State
| 
| Chris Webber (25)
| Chris Webber (16)
| Webber, Williams (5)
| ARCO Arena17,087
| 20–22
|-style="background:#cfc;"
| 43
| April 23
| Minnesota
| 
| Jason Williams (27)
| Chris Webber (19)
| Webber, Williams, Stojaković (4)
| ARCO Arena17,317
| 21–22
|-style="background:#cfc;"
| 44
| April 24
| Dallas
| 
| Vlade Divac (28)
| Vlade Divac (9)
| Jason Williams (7)
| ARCO Arena17,317
| 22–22
|-style="background:#fcc;"
| 45
| April 26
| @ Golden State
| 
| Stojaković, Funderburke (17)
| Vlade Divac (10)
| Vlade Divac (5)
| The Arena in Oakland16,111
| 22–23
|-style="background:#cfc;"
| 46
| April 27
| San Antonio
| 
| Vlade Divac (27)
| Vlade Divac (15)
| Jason Williams (7)
| ARCO Arena16,776
| 23–23
|-style="background:#cfc;"
| 47
| April 29
| L.A. Clippers
| 
| Tariq Abdul-Wahad (19)
| Divac, Pollard (11)
| Jon Barry (9)
| ARCO Arena16,938
| 24–23

|-style="background:#cfc;"
| 48
| May 2
| Phoenix
| 
| Jason Williams (24)
| Chris Webber (13)
| Jason Williams (5)
| ARCO Arena17,317
| 25–23
|-style="background:#cfc;"
| 49
| May 3
| @ Denver
| 
| Vlade Divac (25)
| Scot Pollard (10)
| Jason Williams (9)
| McNichols Sports Arena14,653
| 26–23
|-style="background:#cfc;"
| 50
| May 5
| Vancouver
| 
| Vlade Divac (29)
| Vlade Divac (17)
| Jon Barry (5)
| ARCO Arena17,317
| 27–23

Playoffs

|- align="center" bgcolor="#ffcccc"
| 1
| May 8
| @ Utah
| L 87–117
| Chris Webber (14)
| Chris Webber (9)
| Chris Webber (3)
| Delta Center19,911
| 0–1
|- align="center" bgcolor="#ccffcc"
| 2
| May 10
| @ Utah
| W 101–90
| Chris Webber (20)
| Vlade Divac (7)
| Vlade Divac (8)
| Delta Center19,911
| 1–1
|- align="center" bgcolor="#ccffcc"
| 3
| May 12
| Utah
| W 84–81 (OT)
| Vlade Divac (22)
| Vlade Divac (14)
| Jason Williams (6)
| ARCO Arena17,317
| 2–1
|- align="center" bgcolor="#ffcccc"
| 4
| May 14
| Utah
| L 89–90
| Chris Webber (18)
| Vlade Divac (14)
| Jason Williams (6)
| ARCO Arena17,317
| 2–2
|- align="center" bgcolor="#ffcccc"
| 5
| May 16
| @ Utah
| L 92–99 (OT)
| Vernon Maxwell (22)
| Chris Webber (14)
| Vlade Divac (5)
| Delta Center19,911
| 2–3
|-

Player statistics

Season

‡Waived during the season

Playoffs

Awards and records
 Geoff Petrie, NBA Executive of the Year Award
 Chris Webber, All-NBA Second Team
 Jason Williams, NBA All-Rookie Team 1st Team

Transactions

Free agents

Re-signed

Additions

Subtractions

References

See also
 1998–99 NBA season

Sacramento Kings seasons
Sacramento
Sacramento
Sacramento